William Maud Bryant (February 16, 1933 – March 24, 1969) was a United States Army Special Forces soldier and a recipient of America's highest military decoration—the Medal of Honor—for his actions in the Vietnam War.

Biography
Bryant joined the Army from Detroit, Michigan in 1953. By March 24, 1969, he was serving as a Sergeant First Class in Company A of the 5th Special Forces Group, 1st Special Forces. On that day, in Long Khanh Province, Republic of Vietnam, Bryant led a company of South Vietnamese CIDG troops during an intense attack by North Vietnamese forces until being fatally wounded by enemy fire. For his actions during the battle, Bryant was awarded the Medal of Honor in 1971.

William Bryant's body was returned to the United States and buried in Raleigh National Cemetery, Raleigh, North Carolina.

Medal of Honor citation

See also

 List of Medal of Honor recipients for the Vietnam War

References

1933 births
1969 deaths
American military personnel killed in the Vietnam War
United States Army Medal of Honor recipients
United States Army non-commissioned officers
Burials at Raleigh National Cemetery
Vietnam War recipients of the Medal of Honor
United States Army personnel of the Vietnam War